Pseudothyretes kamitugensis is a moth of the subfamily Arctiinae. It was described by Abel Dufrane in 1945. It is found in Burundi, the Democratic Republic of the Congo, Ghana, Kenya and Uganda.

References

Moths described in 1945
Syntomini
Moths of Africa